Bomberman 64 may refer to:

Bomberman 64 (1997 video game), developed by Hudson Soft
Bomberman 64: The Second Attack, the sequel to Bomberman 64
Bomberman 64 (2001 video game), developed by Racjin